Carl Schurz Vrooman (October 25, 1872 - April 8, 1966) was the Assistant United States Secretary of Agriculture under Woodrow Wilson. He started the victory garden campaign during World War I.

Vroomanwas born in Macon, Missouri to Judge Hiram Perkins Vrooman and Sarah Buffington. Walter Vrooman was his elder brother. On December 28, 1896 he married Julia Green Scott, daughter of Matthew T. Scott and Julia Green, in Chenoa, Illinois. As Julia Scott's father had died, Adlai Stevenson I gave her away at their wedding.

He died on April 8, 1966 in Bloomington, Illinois. His papers are held at the Library of Congress.

Works

References

External links

Carl and Julia Vrooman - McLean County Museum of History

1872 births
1966 deaths
United States Department of Agriculture officials
People from Macon County, Georgia